Wahns is a village and a former municipality in the district Schmalkalden-Meiningen, in Thuringia, Germany. Since 1 January 2019, it is part of the town Wasungen.

References

Former municipalities in Thuringia
Schmalkalden-Meiningen
Duchy of Saxe-Meiningen